Charles Pratt (1830–1891) was an American businessman and philanthropist.

Chuck, Charlie or Charles Pratt may also refer to:

Sportsmen
Charles Edward Pratt (1911–1996), American-Canadian Olympic rower and architect, a/k/a Ned Pratt
Chuck Pratt (1939–2000), American rock climber, instructor and mountain guide
Charlie Pratt (born 1986), American medalist at 2021 Racquetball World Championships

Others
Charles Pratt, 1st Earl Camden (1714–1794), English judge, civil libertarian and defender of American cause
Charles Pratt (Askenootow) (1816–1888), member of Canada's Cree-Assiniboine tribe, interpreter at Treaty 4 negotiations
Charles E. Pratt (1841–1902), American composer of popular music, musician and band leader
Charles Clarence Pratt (1854–1916), American Republican legislator from Pennsylvania
Charles Millard Pratt (1855–1935), American oil industrialist and philanthropist; son of Charles Pratt
Charles Pratt Jr. (born 1955), American television writer, producer and director